Jaffray may refer to:

 Jaffray, British Columbia, Canada
 Jaffray baronets, a title in the Baronetage of the United Kingdom
 "Katharine Jaffray", a traditional Scottish ballad

People with the surname
 David Jaffray (born c. 1970), Canadian medical physicist
 Jason Jaffray (born 1981), Canadian hockey player
 Jean-Yves Jaffray (1939–2009), French mathematician and economist 
 John Jaffray (journalist) (1818–1901), British journalist 
 Lyn Jaffray (born 1950), New Zealand All Black rugby union player
 Merv Jaffray (born 1949), New Zealand All Black rugby union player
 Robert A. Jaffray (1873–1945), Canadian religious leader
 William Jaffray (1832–1896), Canadian newspaper editor and mayor of Berlin, Ontario

See also
 Jeffrey (disambiguation)